Louis-Fouquet de Vincens de Saint-Michel, marquis d'Agoult (Saint-Michel, 5 December 1737 – London, 19 February 1813) was an officer of the Gardes Françaises, described by Thomas Carlyle in his classic recounting of the French Revolution, as a "cast-iron" individual.

History 
On 4 May 1788, fourteen months before the Revolution, that captain of the Gardes Françaises, acting on the order of the Court of Versailles, marched the Parliament of Paris out of the Palais de Justice and removed the key from the premises. The event is considered one of the key mileposts on the road to the Revolution.

References 
 Thomas Carlyle's The French Revolution, A History, Book I, chapter viii.

Medias 
 Colonel d'Agoult is a character in the manga and anime series The Rose of Versailles, created by Riyoko Ikeda.

French military personnel
1737 births
1813 deaths